Robert Stevenson Horne, 1st Viscount Horne of Slamannan,  (28 February 18713 September 1940) was a Scottish businessman, advocate and Unionist politician. He served under David Lloyd George as Minister of Labour between 1919 and 1920, as President of the Board of Trade between 1920 and 1921 and as Chancellor of the Exchequer between 1921 and 1922. In 1937 he was ennobled as Viscount Horne of Slamannan.

Background and education
Horne was born at Slamannan, Stirlingshire, the son of Reverend Robert Stevenson Horne, the village's Church of Scotland minister, and Mary, daughter of Thomas Lockhead. He was educated at George Watson's College in Edinburgh and the University of Glasgow, where he studied Law and was President of the Students' Representative Council.

Career until 1918
Horne then spent a year teaching philosophy at the University College of North Wales, before being elected to the Faculty of Advocates (Scottish Bar) in 1896. He became a successful advocate, specialising in commercial and shipping cases, and became a King's Counsel in 1910. He also served as Examiner in Philosophy (1896–1900) and Rector (1921–1924) at the University of Aberdeen. He was a board member of several companies including directorships of the Suez Canal Company, chairman of the Great Western Railway Company and director of several other companies and banks.

During the First World War, Horne became Director of Railways on the Western Front with the honorary rank of Lieutenant-Colonel in the Royal Engineers. In 1917 he joined the Admiralty as Assistant Inspector-General of Transportation, becoming Director of Materials and Priority in 1918, and Director of Labour and Third Civil Lord later the same year.

Political career
Having unsuccessfully stood for Stirlingshire in both general elections of 1910, Horne was elected as Member of Parliament (MP) for Glasgow Hillhead in 1918. He served under David Lloyd George as Minister of Labour between 1919 and 1920, as President of the Board of Trade between 1920 and 1921 and as Chancellor of the Exchequer between 1921 and 1922. It was in that capacity that he was involved in the negotiations leading to the signing of the Anglo-Soviet Trade Agreement. Leonid Krasin pressurised Horne to support the treaty by threatening to cancel orders with textile mills in Yorkshire, as only the mills with Soviet orders were working full-time. When the treaty was signed, it was the first recognition by Britain of the Russian Soviet Federative Socialist Republic.

When the Lloyd George Coalition Government fell in 1922, Horne refused to join the new government of Bonar Law. Two years later, Stanley Baldwin offered to make Horne Minister of Labour once more, but Horne declined, preferring to concentrate on work in the City. Although he remained a Member of Parliament until 1937, he never again held ministerial office. He was appointed a Knight Commander of the Order of the British Empire (KBE) in 1918 for his war services, and raised to Knight Grand Cross (GBE) in the 1920 civilian war honours for his services as Minister of Labour. In 1919, he was also sworn of the Privy Council. He was ennobled as Viscount Horne of Slamannan, of Slamannan in the County of Stirling, on 9 June 1937.

Personal life
Horne, a womanising bachelor, was famously referred to by Baldwin as a "Scots cad", a remark that has stuck. He died in September 1940, aged 69. The viscountcy became extinct with his death.

References

External links
 

 

1871 births
1940 deaths
20th-century Royal Navy personnel
People educated at George Watson's College
Alumni of the University of Glasgow
Chancellors of the Exchequer of the United Kingdom
Horne, Robert
Horne, Robert
Horne, Robert
Horne, Robert
Horne, Robert
Horne, Robert
Horne, Robert
UK MPs who were granted peerages
Horne, Robert
Horne, Robert
Scottish businesspeople
Rectors of the University of Aberdeen
Knights Grand Cross of the Order of the British Empire
Lords of the Admiralty
Members of the Privy Council of the United Kingdom
Members of the Faculty of Advocates
Horne, Robert
People from Falkirk (council area)
Royal Engineers officers
Conservative Party (UK) hereditary peers
Presidents of the Board of Trade
Hillhead
Viscounts created by George VI